Smellie is a surname of Scottish origin, and may be pronounced "smiley". Smellie is the 191,485th most common surname in the world. It is borne by around 1 in 3,312,521 people. The surname Smellie occurs predominantly in The Americas, where 72 percent of Smellie live; 42 percent live in Caribbean and 42 percent live in Anglo-Caribbean. People with that name include:

 Hon. Anthony Smellie (born 1952), Jamaican-born Chief Justice of the Cayman Islands
 Bob Smellie (1867–1951), Scottish footballer for Queen's Park and Scotland
 Elizabeth Lawrie Smellie (18841968), Canadian nurse
 Gavin Smellie (born 1986), Jamaican-born Canadian sprinter
 Hugh Smellie (184091), Scottish engineer
 Jean Smellie (1927–2020), British paediatrician
 Martin Smellie (1927–1988) Scottish biochemist
 Robert Smellie (19232005), Canadian politician
 Robert Smellie (footballer) ( 1890s), Scottish footballer for Sunderland and Walsall
 Thomas Smellie (politician) (18491925), Canadian doctor and politician
 Thomas Smellie (minister), Presbyterian minister and educator in South Australia in the 1860s
 William Smellie (encyclopedist) (174095), Scottish master printer, naturalist, antiquary, editor and encyclopedist
 William Smellie (geologist) (1885–1973) Scottish geologist
 William Smellie (obstetrician) (16971763), Scottish obstetrician

Other uses 
 Mauriceau–Smellie–Veit maneuver, an obstetric or emergent medical maneuver utilized in cases of breech delivery
 Point Smellie, a headland dominated by Smellie Hill in South Shetland Islands, Antarctica
 Smellie's Building, a heritage-listed warehouse in Brisbane, Queensland, Australia

See also
 
 Smillie

References